is a subway station on the Toei Asakusa Line and Toei Oedo Line, both operated by the Tokyo Metropolitan Bureau of Transportation (Toei). It is located in the Kuramae and Kotobuki neighborhoods of Taitō, Tokyo, Japan. Its number on the Asakusa Line is A-17, and that on the Ōedo Line is E-11. There is not an underground connection between the two stations, but passengers may transfer between them at ground level.

Station layout
On the Asakusa Line, Kuramae has two platforms with the two tracks between them. Track 1 is for passengers bound for Nihombashi and Nishi-magome Stations. Track 2 is for those traveling in the opposite direction toward the terminal of the Asakusa subway line at Oshiage Station. 

On the Oedo Line, an island platform stands between the two tracks. Track 1 serves passengers bound for Iidabashi and Tochōmae Stations, while Track 2 carries trains toward Ryōgoku and Daimon Stations.

History
Kuramae Station opened on December 4, 1960, as a station on Toei Line 1 (the present-day Asakusa Line). The Oedo Line (Line 12) station opened on December 12, 2000.

Surrounding area
The station serves the Kuramae and Kotobuki neighborhoods. Nearby are the Kuramae Water Treatment Center (on the site of the old Kuramae sumo stadium, which the station served until the stadium closed), the Sumida River, National Route 6, offices of the Waterworks and Bureau of Sewerage, the Torigoe Shrine.

See also
 List of railway stations in Japan

References

This article incorporates material from the article 蔵前駅 (Kuramae-eki) in the Japanese Wikipedia, retrieved on December 16, 2007.

Railway stations in Tokyo
Toei Asakusa Line